Faltings's theorem is a result in arithmetic geometry, according to which a curve of genus greater than 1 over the field  of rational numbers has only finitely many rational points. This was conjectured in 1922 by Louis Mordell, and known as the Mordell conjecture until its 1983 proof by Gerd Faltings. The conjecture was later generalized by replacing  by any number field.

Background
Then the set of rational points on  may be determined as follows:
 When , there are either no points or infinitely many. In such cases,  may be handled as a conic section.
 When , if there are any points, then  is an elliptic curve and its rational points form a finitely generated abelian group. (This is Mordell's Theorem, later generalized to the Mordell–Weil theorem.) Moreover, Mazur's torsion theorem restricts the structure of the torsion subgroup.
 When , according to Faltings's theorem,  has only a finite number of rational points.

Proofs
Igor Shafarevich conjectured that there are only finitely many isomorphism classes of abelian varieties of fixed dimension and fixed polarization degree over a fixed number field with good reduction outside a fixed finite set of places. Aleksei Parshin showed that Shafarevich's finiteness conjecture would imply the Mordell conjecture, using what is now called Parshin's trick. 

Gerd Faltings proved Shafarevich's finiteness conjecture using a known reduction to a case of the Tate conjecture, together with tools from algebraic geometry, including the theory of Néron models. The main idea of Faltings's proof is the comparison of Faltings heights and naive heights via Siegel modular varieties.

Later proofs
 Paul Vojta gave a proof based on diophantine approximation. Enrico Bombieri found a more elementary variant of Vojta's proof.
Brian Lawrence  and Akshay Venkatesh gave a proof based on -adic Hodge theory, borrowing also some of the easier ingredients of Faltings's original proof.

Consequences
Faltings's 1983 paper had as consequences a number of statements which had previously been conjectured:

 The Mordell conjecture that a curve of genus greater than 1 over a number field has only finitely many rational points;
 The Isogeny theorem that abelian varieties with isomorphic Tate modules (as -modules with Galois action) are isogenous.

Generalizations
Because of the Mordell–Weil theorem, Faltings's theorem can be reformulated as a statement about the intersection of a curve  with a finitely generated subgroup  of an abelian variety .

Even more general conjectures have been put forth by Paul Vojta.

The Mordell conjecture for function fields was proved by Yuri Ivanovich Manin and by Hans Grauert. In 1990, Robert F. Coleman found and fixed a gap in Manin's proof.

Notes

Citations

References

 → Contains an English translation of 

 → Gives Vojta's proof of Faltings's Theorem.



Diophantine geometry
Theorems in number theory
Theorems in algebraic geometry